Jesuit High School of Sacramento is a private Catholic high school run by the USA West Province of the Society of Jesus in the Sacramento suburb of Arden-Arcade, California. It was founded by the Jesuits in 1963 and enrolls about 1,000 young men from throughout greater Sacramento Valley in California.

About

Jesuit is a four-year, college preparatory high school conducted by the Society of Jesus (Jesuits). Admission is selective, through application in the 8th grade, a written examination which takes place on the school's campus, approval by the admissions office, and an interview by a faculty member of the school. Transfer applications are accepted for the 10th and 11th grades.

Multiple sex abuse scandals have gripped the school's community throughout the years. In one case, it was discovered that  Father William Farrington, a swimming and diving coach, molested more than 10 male students before he was relocated to Bellarmine College Preparatory in San Jose without any punishment from the Catholic diocese. In another series of incidents, Rev. William Feeser was accused of sexually assaulting students and supposedly went unnoticed during his 13 years at the school. More information: Sexual abuse scandal in the Society of Jesus.

Jesuit is accredited by the Western Association of Schools and Colleges (WASC) and the Western Catholic Education Association (WCEA). Additionally, Jesuit is a member of the College Board, the Jesuit Secondary Education Association, and the National Association for College Admission Counseling.

In 2016, the Washington Post named Jesuit High one of America's most challenging private schools.

Campus life
Each building on campus is named after one of the eight North American Martyrs, who are the school's patron saints. The largest building – the Jesuit Residence and Main Office – is named Brébeuf Hall.

Activities
The many clubs and co-curricular activities offered by Jesuit include: The Plank newspaper, The Cutlass yearbook, Speech and Debate, Robotics, Drama (Theater), Future Business Leaders of America, Mock trial, Mathletes, Drumline, and Young Democrats and Republicans.

The Jesuit High School International Robotics Team competes at the collegiate level, and is one of only two high school robotics teams entered in underwater robotics. In June 2011 the team won the Marine Advanced Technology Education Center (MATE) ROV competition which was held at the Neutral Buoyancy Lab in Houston, Texas. The team of about 20 students from all four years in the school is structured as a company with subgroups working together to design, build, test, and deliver one successful product. In 2012 the team placed third and in 2013 first at the MATE competition in Tacoma, WA, repeating again in 2014 with a first place in Alpena, MI. In 2015 the team captured its third international MATE ROV competition in St. John's, Newfoundland, Canada. In addition to being the overall champions, the team won awards in Design Excellence, Best Technical Documentation, Best Sales Presentation, and Best Product Demonstration.

Sports
Jesuit High School offers 15 varsity sports, most of which also feature JV and freshman squads.

Jesuit's rugby program won nine national championships through 2019, along with multiple state championships.  After battling illness and weather delays at the 2019 national championships in Salt Lake City, Jesuit eked out a narrow victory against longtime cross-country rival Gonzaga College High School, to advance to the championship match.  In an unprecedented act, Gonzaga formed a tunnel to honor their rival as Jesuit took the field.  In that game, Jesuit won their ninth championship over near home town Herriman High School, holding Herriman a mere foot from the goal line as time expired.  Jesuit High School has also produced many rugby players who have gone on to represent the United States National Team at the U-16, U-17, U-19, Collegiate, and Men's levels, detailed below in notable alumni.

The cross country team has won nine state championships and qualified for Nike Cross Nationals in 2005 and 2006, placing 7th and 4th respectively.

Jesuit’s eSports Super Smash Bros. team has won two state championships in 2021 and 2022, including the first CIF-sanctioned title in May 2021 by beating the previously undefeated and top-ranked team Franklin High School (Los Angeles) at the Super Smash Bros. Ultimate California State Championship.

The Marauders' chief rival is Christian Brothers High School (Sacramento, California). This rivalry culminates in the Holy Bowl - an annual, Jesuit-Christian Brothers American football game generally held in Charles C. Hughes Stadium. The current standings of the bowl game is 33-18-2 in favor of Jesuit.

Notable alumni

 Major Gen. Leo A. Brooks, Jr. (Ret.), U.S. Army Commandant, U.S. Military Academy, West Point
 Gen. Vincent K. Brooks, U.S. Army, commander U.S. Army Pacific, commander U.S. Third Army, Deputy Director of Operations during Iraq War
Ryan T. Holte, Federal Judge, United States Court of Federal Claims
 Kevin Keller, contemporary classical composer and pianist
Chris Sullivan, actor on TV shows, This is Us and Stranger Things

Athletes
Baseball
 Lars Anderson, first baseman for the Toronto Blue Jays
Zach Green, MLB first baseman for the San Francisco Giants
Rhys Hoskins, MLB first baseman for the Philadelphia Phillies
 J. P. Howell, pitcher for the Toronto Blue Jays
 Jerry Nielsen, MLB pitcher
 Mike Rose, MLB catcher
 Andrew Susac, catcher for the Baltimore Orioles

Basketball
 Isaac Fontaine, NBA basketball player with the Memphis Grizzlies
 Festus Ezeli, NBA player for the Portland Trail Blazers

Football
 Matt Bouza, nine-year NFL wide receiver for the San Francisco 49ers and the Indianapolis Colts
 Nigel Burton, head coach of the Portland State Vikings
 Giovanni Carmazzi, quarterback and third-round draft pick by the San Francisco 49ers
 John Huddleston, linebacker for the Oakland Raiders
 Etu Molden, wide receiver/defensive back for the Chicago Rush of the Arena Football League
 Ken O'Brien, quarterback for the New York Jets and Philadelphia Eagles
 J. T. O'Sullivan, NFL quarterback
 Isaiah Frey, NFL cornerback
 Ferric Collons, NFL Defensive End

Golf
 Scott Gordon, PGA Tour Golfer

Olympians
 Jeffrey Float, Olympic medalist in swimming
 Michael Stember, Olympic middle-distance runner

Rugby
Christian Dyer, professional rugby player, USA international in both Rugby 7s and Rugby 15s
Eric Fry, professional rugby player, USA international in 2011 Rugby World Cup
Colin Hawley, professional rugby player, USA international in 2011 Rugby World Cup
Kirk Khasigian, professional rugby player, USA international in 2003 Rugby World Cup
Kort Schubert, professional rugby player, USA international in 2007 Rugby World Cup
Blaine Scully, professional rugby player, USA international in 2011 Rugby World Cup
Louis Stanfill, professional rugby player, USA international in 2007 Rugby World Cup and 2011 Rugby World Cup
Nicklas Boyer, professional rugby player, USA international in both Rugby 7s and Rugby 15s

Soccer
Adam Jahn, Major League Soccer player
Sean Michael Callahan, Major League Soccer player
Amobi Okugo, Major League Soccer player
Cameron Iwasa, USL Championship player
Niko Hansen, Major League Soccer player

Tennis
Sam Warburg, professional tennis player

Track and Field
 Harold Kuphaldt, former national record holder, 3200 meters
Eric Mastalir, former national record holder, 3200 meters

See also
List of Jesuit secondary schools in the United States

References

External links

 

Jesuit high schools in the United States
High schools in Sacramento County, California
Educational institutions established in 1963
Catholic secondary schools in California
Carmichael, California
Boys' schools in California
1963 establishments in California
Roman Catholic Diocese of Sacramento